Anaclerio is an Italian surname. Notable people with the surname include:

Luigi Anaclerio (born 1981), Italian footballer
Michele Anaclerio (born 1982), Italian footballer

Italian-language surnames